Meshkan (also Romanized as Meshkān; also known as Moshgān) is a village in Kiskan Rural District, in the Central District of Baft County, Kerman Province, Iran. At the 2006 census, its population was 174, in 54 families.

References 

Populated places in Baft County